"Hit Mix" is a single by Greek singer Katy Garbi. It was released in 2002 by Sony Music Greece. It is a 1-track mix of 13 greatest hits from Katy Garbi.

Track listing 
1 track includes samples of:
"Thelo Apopse Na Horepso" (Tonight I Want to Dance)
"Perasmena Ksehasmena" (Forgotten Past)
"Mou Lipeis" (I Miss You)
"Kolasi" (Hell)
"Pes To M'Ena Fili" (Say It with a Kiss)
"Ksipoliti Horevo" (Kante Akri) (Dancing Bare-foot (Move Aside))
"Mia Fora Kai Ena Kairo" (Once Upon a Time)
"Nai Yparho Ego" (Yes I Exist)
"Se Poliorkia" (Pes Pes) (You're a Stalemate (Say It, Say It))
"Mi Me Sigrineis" (Do Not Compare Me)
"Hamena" (Lost)
"Viastika" (Hurry)

Charts
The single debuted at number 20 on the Greece Top 20 chart and peaked at number 7 in its third week. The single remained in the chart for 5 weeks total. The single charted on the singles chart as it was a 1-track mix of a number of greatests hits.

References

2002 songs
2002 singles
Greek-language songs
Katy Garbi songs
Music medleys